Laniers, also known as Laniersville, is an unincorporated community in Talladega County, Alabama, United States.

History
Laniers is named for the Lanier family, who settled in the area in the 1890s. A post office operated under the name Laniers from 1903 to 1907.

References

Unincorporated communities in Talladega County, Alabama
Unincorporated communities in Alabama